Byron Bullock (born March 4, 1987) is a former professional Canadian football linebacker.

Bullock re-signed with the Hamilton Tiger-Cats on April 10, 2012 after joining the team's practice roster late in the 2011 season.  He was previously a member of the Saskatchewan Roughriders in 2010. Byron Bullock played college football for the University of South Dakota Coyotes.

References

External links
Just Sports Stats
Hamilton Tiger-Cats bio

1987 births
Living people
American players of Canadian football
Canadian football linebackers
Saskatchewan Roughriders players
South Dakota Coyotes football players
Hamilton Tiger-Cats players